, also known as Tokyo City Keiba (TCK), is located in Shinagawa, Tokyo, Japan. Built in 1950 for horse racing, on weekends it also hosts one of the largest Tokyo-area flea markets. 

The racecourse is located near Ōi Keibajō Mae Station on the Tokyo Monorail.

The Tokyo City Cup held annually at Santa Anita Park in Arcadia, California honors the partnership between the American racetrack and Ohi Racecourse. In recognition of their relationship, TCK holds "Santa Anita Week" each summer which features the one mile G3 "Santa Anita Trophy".

Notable races 
 Tokyo Daishōten (International Grade 1)
 Tokyo Derby
 Teio Sho
 Tokyo Kinen
 Japan Dirt Derby
 Haneda Hai
 Tokyo Princess Sho
 Tokyo Nisai Yūshun Himba
 Kinpai

Former races 

Tokyo Okan Sho - Ended in 2001

See also 
 National Association of Racing

References
 Tokyo City Racecourse website (Japanese language)
 Tokyo City Cup at Santa Anita Park official website

Sports venues in Tokyo
Horse racing venues in Japan
Shinagawa
Sports venues completed in 1950
1950 establishments in Japan